Anugrah Narayan College, Patna (popularly known as A N College) is a co-educational institution of the state of Bihar, India. It is located in Patna, the state capital city, on a  site. A Constituent unit of Patliputra University, the college was established in January, 1956 and its first principal was economist Dr. Gorak Nath Sinha. The college has 22 Undergraduate departments and 23 Postgraduate departments. The college has been selected for Chancellor Award 2021 in Best College and Best Principal of Bihar.

History 
The institution was founded in 1956 as Gardanibagh  College. It was located then at Patna High School and operated as an evening school to further the education of employees. It was subsequently renamed as Anugrah Narayan College in honour of Bihar Vibhuti Dr. Anugrah Narayan Sinha, one of the founders of modern Bihar, In 1959 the college moved to a rented building in Anisabad.

Many prominent figures have been associated with the college, and its governing body has also featured notable people such as Chief Justice of Bihar Justice K.B.N. Singh, Satyendra Narayan Sinha, Rajiv Pratap Rudy, Kishori Sinha, Justice Birendra Pratap Singh, Sheo Narayan Singh and Sunil Mukherjee.The Union Minister Shri Rajiv Pratap Rudy is a lecturer in economics at the A.N. College.
While maintaining its traditional educational courses, the college has introduced a number of technology- and industry-driven courses. Many new courses in fields such as electronics and environmental sciences were introduced during the 1980s on the initiative of the University Grants Commission and the Government of Bihar,

Notable alumni 
Amitabh Singh, Deputy Project Director and Operations Director, Chandrayaan 2 Mission, Indian Space Research Organisation
Subodh Kant Sahay, former Union Tourism Minister.
Sanjay Nirupam, politician
Ravindra Kishore Sinha, Rajya Sabha MP

References

External links

Constituent colleges of Patliputra University
Educational institutions established in 1956
Universities and colleges in Patna
1956 establishments in Bihar